Serbia is a Christian majority country, with Islam being a minority faith representing around 3% of the total population. Islam spread to Serbia during the three centuries of Ottoman rule. The Muslims in Serbia are mostly ethnic Bosniaks, Albanians and significant part of Muslim Roma as well as members of the smaller groups, like ethnic Muslims, Gorani and Serbs (Čitaci).

Demographics
According to 2011 census, there were 228,658 Muslims in Serbia (3% of total population. The census was boycotted by some Bosniaks from the Sandžak region, since Muamer Zukorlić one of the leaders of the Party of Justice and Reconciliation, called upon his followers not to take part in the census. Moreover, the largely Albanian population of Preševo, Bujanovac and Medveđa municipalities boycotted the census, too. Thus, the actual number of Muslims in Serbia is likely to be at least about 50,000 higher. Largest concentration of Muslims in Serbia could be found in the municipalities of Novi Pazar, Tutin and Sjenica in the Sandžak region, and in the municipalities of Preševo and Bujanovac in the Preševo Valley.

Ethnic groups
Bosniaks and ethnic Muslims, mostly living in the Sandžak region; 
Albanians, mostly living in the Preševo Valley region;
Muslim Roma, including Balkan Romani speaking and Serbian-speaking groups from southern Serbia as well as Albanian-speaking groups;
Gorani, Slavic ethnic group;
Native Serbs (Čitaci), comprised only 0.04% of Serbia's total population.

Geographical distribution
The municipality of Novi Pazar is home to Serbia's largest Muslim population, with 82,710 Muslims out of 100,410 inhabitants (82% of its population). The municipality of Tutin has the highest share of Muslims in Serbia, with around 94% of its population being Muslim.  Sjenica Municipality has also a very large Muslim population (79%), followed by Prijepolje Municipality (45%). Most Albanians, who belong to the Islamic faith, living in Preševo, Bujanovac and Medveđa boycotted the 2011 census, but statistics from the 2002 Census shows that Muslims constitute a majority in those municipalities with 89% and 55%, respectively and in Medveđa they numbered around 29% of the population.

Organization
Adherents of Islam in Serbia are organized into two separate bodies: the Islamic Community in Serbia subordinate to the Islamic Community of Bosnia and Herzegovina, and the Islamic Community of Serbia founded in 2007 which traces its origins to the Principality of Serbia. In 2012, the reis-ul-ulema Mustafa Cerić of Bosnia published a fatwa against Adem Zilkić, leader of the Islamic Community of Serbia, categorizing his actions as Masjid al-Dirar.

The Islamic Community of Serbia (Islamska zajednica Srbije), with seat in Belgrade, is administered by reis-ul-ulema Sead Nasufović. It is divided into:

Mešihat of Serbia, with seat in Belgrade
Mešihat of Raška, with seat in Novi Pazar
Mešihat of Preševo, with seat in Preševo

The Islamic Community in Serbia (Islamska zajednica u Srbiji), with seat in Novi Pazar, is administered by mufti Mevlud Dudić, which include:
Islamic Community in Sandzak region or Muftiship of Sandžak, with seat in Novi Pazar, administered by mufti Mevlud Dudić.
Islamic Community in Vojvodina or Muftiship of Novi Sad, with seat in Novi Sad, administered by mufti Fadil Murati.
Islamic Community in Preševo Valley or Muftiship of Preševo, with seat in Preševo.
Islamic Community in Central Serbia or Muftiship of Belgrade, with seat in Belgrade.

Gallery

See also
Religion in Serbia

References

External links

 Islamic community of Serbia (IZS)
 Islamic community in Serbia (IZuS)
 Publishing house of ICinS
 Faculty of Islamic studies in Novi Pazar